Terry Bluford Moore (May 27, 1912 – March 29, 1995) was an American professional baseball center fielder, manager, and coach. He played for the St. Louis Cardinals (–, –), and later coached for them (–, –). Moore managed the  Philadelphia Phillies, taking the reins from Steve O’Neill, for the second half of the season.

Playing career

A right-handed batter and thrower, Moore began his professional baseball career in 1932. In 1934, he hit .328 in the American Association and earned a roster spot with the Cardinals the following season.

Moore joined the Cardinals the year after the Gashouse Gang won the 1934 World Series. He hit for a career .280 batting average in 1,298 games, with 80 home runs. He played on two National League championship and world champion teams: the 1942 and 1946 Cardinals. During his career (interrupted by World War II service), he played with greats such as Dizzy Dean, Joe Medwick, Frankie Frisch, Johnny Mize, Enos Slaughter, and Stan Musial — all members of the Baseball Hall of Fame. However, Moore was the captain of those Cardinals teams.

On September 5, 1935, Moore went 6-for-6 against the Boston Braves in a 15-3 rout at Sportsman's Park.

Moore was also known for being a great center fielder, who would have won several Gold Gloves had the award been available. Moore compiled a career .985 fielding percentage at that position. He was an All-Star for four straight seasons, from 1939 to 1942.

Later life
When his playing days ended, Moore served two terms (1949–52; 1956–58) as a Cardinals coach. He also managed the Philadelphia Phillies in 1954. After beginning the 1954 season as a Phillies scout, he replaced Steve O'Neill as the club's manager on July 15. He managed the Phils for exactly half a season — 77 games — and the team won 35 of those games (for a winning percentage of .455).

See also
List of Major League Baseball single-game hits leaders
List of Major League Baseball players who spent their entire career with one franchise
List of Philadelphia Phillies managers
List of St. Louis Cardinals coaches

References

Further reading

External links

Terry Moore at SABR (Baseball BioProject)
Terry Moore at Baseball Almanac

1912 births
1995 deaths
Baseball players from Alabama
Columbus Red Birds players
Elmira Red Wings players
Major League Baseball center fielders
National League All-Stars
People from Collinsville, Illinois
People from Vernon, Alabama
Philadelphia Phillies managers
Philadelphia Phillies scouts
St. Louis Cardinals coaches
St. Louis Cardinals players
United States Army personnel of World War II
Burials in Illinois